Madrid Xanadú is a large shopping mall and entertainment center in Arroyomolinos, Madrid, Spain. Constructed next to the Autovía de Extremadura highway, the mall is one of Europe's largest, with over 222 shops, eateries, and a 15-screen Cinesa Movie Theater. The most distinctive attraction is Madrid SnowZone, an indoor ski slope. The slope is from a Canadian company, Intrawest. The mall was named after the 1981 film Xanadu, starring Oliva Newton-John.

Major Anchors
Cinesa 15 Theaters
El Corte Inglés
Hipercor at El Corte Inglés 
Madrid SnowZone

Mall Ownership
The American-based Mills Corporation developed the mall in 2002.  It opened the next year with great fanfare.  Madrid Xanadú was the company's first mall outside the United States and was planning to build more malls in Europe.  
In 2006, the Canadian real estate company Ivanhoé Cambridge bought Madrid Xanadú from Mills to alleviate the latter company's financial problems.

On 31 January 2017 Intu Properties announced to the London Stock Exchange: “intu confirms it has entered into an exclusivity agreement with entities of the Ivanhoé Cambridge Group to acquire the centre. The transaction would be funded from a combination of bank financing and existing facilities. At this time there is no certainty that this transaction will complete and a further announcement will be made as and when appropriate.”

Xanadu's Counterpart
In 2004, The Mills started to build its counterpart, American Dream (formerly named Meadowlands Xanadu) in New Jersey. However, ownership changes and countless delays plagued the schedule for the opening. The first phase of the project opened on October 25 2019. The rest of project opened on December 5 2019, and October 1 2020.

References

External links 
 Snowy Pleasure Dome at Madrid Xanadú

See Also 

 American Dream Meadowlands

Indoor ski resorts
Shopping malls in Spain
Buildings and structures in the Community of Madrid
Ivanhoé Cambridge